Schultesianthus is a genus of flowering plants belonging to the family Solanaceae.

Its native range is from southern Mexico down to Venezuela and Peru. It is also found in Colombia, Costa Rica, Ecuador, Guatemala, Honduras and Panamá.

The genus name of Schultesianthus is in honour of Richard Evans Schultes (1915–2001), an American biologist. 
It was first described and published in Kurtziana Vol.10 on page 35 in 1977.

Known species
According to Kew:
Schultesianthus coriaceus 
Schultesianthus crosbyanus 
Schultesianthus dudleyi 
Schultesianthus leucanthus 
Schultesianthus megalandrus 
Schultesianthus odorifer 
Schultesianthus uniflorus 
Schultesianthus venosus

References

Solanaceae
Solanaceae genera
Plants described in 1977
Flora of Southeastern Mexico
Flora of Southwestern Mexico
Flora of Central America
Flora of Venezuela
Flora of western South America